The Nonconformist Relief Act 1779 (19 Geo. III c. 44) was Act of the Parliament of Great Britain. The Act allowed any Dissenter to preach and teach on the condition that he declared he was a Christian and a Protestant; took the Oaths of Allegiance and supremacy; and took the Scriptures for his rule of faith and practice.

The Dissenters (Ireland) Act 1817 (57 Geo. 3 c. 70) extended the 1779 act to Ireland.

Notes

History of Christianity in the United Kingdom
Great Britain Acts of Parliament 1779
Nonconformism
Law about religion in the United Kingdom
1779 in Christianity